The 2020 SEC women's soccer tournament is the postseason women's soccer tournament for the 2020 Southeastern Conference season. The tournament is being contested over five days between November 13–22 at the Orange Beach Sportsplex in Orange Beach, Alabama. The South Carolina Gamecocks are the defending champions.

Due to the shortened conference season as a result of the COVID-19 pandemic, this year's conference tournament includes every team, in a format identical to that of the men's and women's basketball tournaments.

Teams

Schedule

*Game times in Central Time. #Rankings denote tournament seeding.

Bracket

Match summaries 
All matches are played at Orange Beach Sportsplex in Orange Beach, Alabama. All times are Central.

First Round

Second Round

Quarterfinals

Semifinals

Championship

Statistics

Goalscorers

Discipline

See also 

 Southeastern Conference
 2020 NCAA Division I women's soccer season
 2020 NCAA Division I Women's Soccer Tournament

References 

2020 Southeastern Conference women's soccer season
2020